Erbessa capena is a moth of the family Notodontidae first described by Herbert Druce in 1885. It is found in Colombia, Ecuador, Peru, Brazil and French Guiana.

References

Moths described in 1885
Notodontidae of South America